Pedra Azul (Portuguese for "blue stone") is a Brazilian municipality in the state of Minas Gerais, located in the northeast of the state, in the Jequitinhonha River valley region.  The population in 2020 was 24,329 in a total area of 1,619 km2.

The city belongs to the mesoregion of Jequitinhonha and to the microregion of Pedra Azul.  The elevation of the municipal seat is 617 meters.  It became a municipality in 1911.  This municipality is located 16 km. to the east of the important BR-116 highway, which links Rio de Janeiro to Salvador.  The boundary with the state of Bahia is 49 km. to the northeast.

Pedra Azul is also a statistical microregion that includes the following municipalities: Cachoeira de Pajeú, Comercinho, Itaobim, Medina, and Pedra Azul.

The main economic activities are cattle raising and farming.  The GDP was R$111,200,000 (2005).  There were 2 banking agencies in 2006.  In the rural area there were 570 farms with around 1,700 people involved in the agricultural sector.  There were 58 tractors, a ratio of one tractor for every 10 farms.  The main crops were bananas, coffee, passion fruit, beans, manioc, and corn.  In the health sector there were 10 health clinics and 1 hospital with 66 beds.  The score on the Municipal Human Development Index was 0.660.  This ranked Pedra Azul 709 out of 853 municipalities in the state, with Poços de Caldas in first place with 0.841 and Setubinha in last place with 0.568. See Frigoletto  for the complete list.

See also
List of municipalities in Minas Gerais

References

Statistics from IBGE

Municipalities in Minas Gerais